Fulvalene (bicyclopentadienylidene) is the member of the fulvalene family with the molecular formula C10H8.  It is of theoretical interest as one of the simplest non-benzenoid conjugated hydrocarbons.  Fulvalene is an unstable isomer of the more common benzenoid aromatic compounds naphthalene and azulene. Fulvalene consists of two 5-membered rings, each with two double bonds, joined by yet a fifth double bond.  It has D2h symmetry.

History 

An earlier attempt at synthesis of fulvalene in 1951 by Pauson and Kealy resulted in the accidental discovery of ferrocene. Its synthesis was first reported in 1958 by E. A. Matzner, working under William von Eggers Doering. In this method, cyclopentadienyl anion is coupled with iodine to the dihydrofulvalene. Double deprotonation of dihydrofulvalene with n-butyllithium gives the dilithio derivative, which oxidizes with oxygen. The compound was isolated in 1986. It was found to be nonaromatic. Above  it dimerizes by a Diels–Alder reaction.

Derivatives 
Perchlorofulvalene (C4Cl4C)2 is quite stable in contrast to fulvalene itself.

See also
 Fulvenes, (CH=CH)2C=CH2 and substituted derivatives
 Tetrathiafulvalene, C2H2S2C=CS2C2H2

References

Hydrocarbons
Fulvalenes